Vietnamese Americans are Americans of Vietnamese ancestry. They make up about half of all overseas Vietnamese and are the fourth-largest Asian American ethnic group after Chinese Americans, Filipino Americans, and Indian Americans. There are about 2.2 million people of Vietnamese descent residing in the U.S.

The Vietnamese community in the United States was minimal until the South Vietnamese immigration to the country following the Vietnam War, which ended in 1975. Early immigrants were refugee boat people who were loyal to the now defunct South Vietnam in the Vietnam War conflict, who fled due to fear of political persecution. More than half of Vietnamese Americans reside in the two most populous states of California and Texas, primarily their large urban areas. 

Coming from different waves of immigration, Vietnamese Americans have a lower educational attainment than overall total Asian American population but it is still higher than other Southeast Asian groups and is also trending upward. Vietnamese American  anticommunist activism takes root from the long tradition of Vietnamese anticommunism, originated from the colonial period, the end and aftermath of the World War II, intensified during the Indochina Wars, and deepened from the Fall of Saigon, injustice in reeducation camps as well as other oppressions by the communist regime.

Demographics

Income
In 2019, the median household income for U.S.-born Vietnamese Americans was $82,400 As a relatively-recent immigrant group, most Vietnamese Americans are either first or second generation Americans. As many as one million people five years of age and older speak Vietnamese at home, making it the fifth-most-spoken language in the U.S. In the 2012 American Community Survey (ACS), 76 percent of foreign-born Vietnamese are naturalized U.S. citizens (compared to 67 percent of people from Southeast Asia and 46 percent of the total U.S. foreign-born population). Of those born outside the United States, 73.1 percent entered before 2000, 21.2 percent from 2000 and 2009 and 5.7 percent after 2010.

In 2018, the U.S. Census Bureau estimated the total population of Vietnamese Americans was 2,162,610 (92.1% reporting one race, 7.2% reporting two races, 0.7% reporting three races, and 0.1% reporting four or more races). California and Texas had the highest concentrations of Vietnamese Americans: 40 and 12 percent of Vietnamese immigrants, respectively. Other states with concentrations of Vietnamese Americans were Washington, Florida (four percent each) and Virginia (three percent). The largest number of Vietnamese outside Vietnam is in Orange County, California (184,153, or 6.1 percent of the county's population), followed by Los Angeles and Santa Clara counties; the three counties accounted for 26 percent of the Vietnamese immigrant population in the United States. 
Many Vietnamese American businesses exist in the Little Saigon of Westminster and Garden Grove, where Vietnamese Americans make up 40.2 and 27.7 percent of the population respectively. About 41 percent of the Vietnamese immigrant population lives in five major metropolitan areas: in descending order, Los Angeles, San Jose, Houston, San Francisco and Dallas-Fort Worth. The Vietnamese immigration pattern has shifted to other cities, including Denver, Boston, Chicago, Oklahoma (Oklahoma City and Tulsa in particular) and Oregon (Portland in particular).

Vietnamese Americans are more likely to be Christians than the Vietnamese in Vietnam. Christians (mainly Roman Catholics) make up about six percent of Vietnam's population and about 23 percent of the Vietnamese American population. Due to hostility between Communists and Catholics in Vietnam, many Catholics fled the country after the Communist takeover, and many Catholic Churches had sponsored them to America.

Economics
In 2019, the median household income for all Vietnamese Americans was $69,800.  Broken down by birth, the income was $82,400 for U.S.-born and $66,000 for foreign-born Vietnamese-Americans. 

In 2019, Pew Research Center published a study stating that 12% of Vietnamese Americans lived under the poverty line, which was higher than the average for all Asian Americans.

Employment
The U.S. Census Bureau reports in 2016 among working Vietnamese Americans (civilian employed population 16 years and over): 32.9% had management, business, science, and arts occupations; 30.9% had service occupations; 17.0% had sales and office occupations, 4.3% had reported natural resources, construction, and maintenance occupations; and 15% had natural resources, construction, and maintenance occupations.

Though Vietnamese immigration has continued at a fairly steady pace since the 1980s, the pathway to immigration for Vietnamese today has shifted entirely. As opposed to the earlier history of Vietnamese migration that stemmed predominantly from refugees, an overwhelming majority of Vietnamese are now granted LPR on the basis of family sponsored preferences or by way of immediate relatives to U.S. citizens, at 53% and 44% respectively. This marks a complete about face, as in 1982, 99% of Vietnamese who received green cards obtained them on humanitarian grounds, while in 2019 only 1% of Vietnamese who received LPR status did so through this channel.

Education

In 2019, 55% of U.S.-born Vietnamese Americans had attained a bachelor's degree or higher.

English proficiency
In 2019, 90% of U.S.-born Vietnamese Americans but only 35% of foreign-born Vietnamese were English proficient.

View of education

Vietnam's traditional Confucianist society values education and learning, and many Vietnamese Americans have worked their way up from menial labor to have their second-generation children attend college and become successful.

History
The history of Vietnamese Americans is fairly recent. Before 1975, most Vietnamese residing in the U.S. were the wives and children of American servicemen or academics. Records indicate that a few Vietnamese (including Ho Chi Minh) arrived and performed menial work during the late 19th and early 20th centuries. According to the Immigration and Naturalization Service, 650 Vietnamese arrived as immigrants between 1950 and 1974, but the figure excludes students, diplomats, and military trainees. The April 30, 1975, fall of Saigon, which ended the Vietnam War, prompted the first large-scale wave of immigration; many with close ties to America or the South Vietnam government feared communist reprisals. Most of the first-wave immigrants were well-educated, financially comfortable, and proficient in English. According to 1975 U.S. State Department data, more than 30 percent of the heads of first-wave households were medical professionals or technical managers, 16.9 percent worked in transportation, and 11.7 percent had clerical or sales jobs in Vietnam. Less than 5 percent were fishermen or farmers.

The evacuation of the immigrants was organized in three major ways. The week before Saigon fell, 15,000 people left on scheduled flights followed by an additional 80,000 also evacuated by air. The last group was carried on U.S. Navy ships. During the spring of 1975 125,000 people left South Vietnam, followed by more than 5,000 in 1976–1977. They arrived at reception camps in the Philippines and Guam before being transferred to temporary housing at U.S. military bases, including Camp Pendleton (California), Fort Chaffee (Arkansas), Eglin Air Force Base (Florida) and Fort Indiantown Gap (Pennsylvania). After preparations for resettlement, they were assigned to one of nine voluntary agencies (VOLAGs) to help them find financial and personal support from sponsors in the U.S.

South Vietnamese refugees were initially resented by Americans, since the memory of defeat was fresh; according to a 1975 poll, only 36 percent of Americans favored Vietnamese immigration. However, the U.S. government informed public opinion as it felt that it had a moral obligation to the refugees, and President Gerald Ford and Congress both agreed to pass the Indochina Migration and Refugee Assistance Act in 1975, which allowed Vietnamese refugees to enter the United States under a special status and allocated $405 million in resettlement aid. To prevent the refugees from forming ethnic enclaves and minimize their impact on local communities, they were distributed throughout the country, but within a few years, many resettled in California and Texas.

A second wave of Vietnamese refugees arrived from 1978 to the mid-1980s. Political and economic instability under the new communist government led to a migration unprecedented in Vietnam. South Vietnamese, particularly former military officers and government employees, were sent to "re-education camps," which were really concentration camps, for intensive political indoctrination. Famine was widespread, and businesses were seized and nationalized. Chinese-Vietnamese relations soured when China became Vietnam's adversary in the brief Sino-Vietnamese War. To escape, many South Vietnamese fled on small, unsafe, crowded fishing boats. Over 70 percent of the first immigrants were from urban areas, but the "boat people" were generally lower socioeconomically, as most were peasant farmers or fishermen, small-town merchants or former military officials. Survivors were picked up by foreign ships and brought to asylum camps in Thailand, Malaysia, Singapore, Indonesia, Hong Kong, and the Philippines from which they entered countries that agreed to accept them.

The plight of the boat people compelled the U.S. to act, and the Refugee Act of 1980 eased restrictions on the entry of Vietnamese refugees. From 1978 to 1982, 280,500 Vietnamese refugees were admitted In 1979, the Orderly Departure Program (ODP) was established under the United Nations High Commissioner for Refugees (UNHCR) to allow emigration from Vietnam to the U.S. and other countries. Additional legislation permitted Amerasian children and former political prisoners and their families to enter the United States. Vietnamese immigration peaked in 1992, when many re-education-camp inmates were released and sponsored by their families in the U.S. Between 1981 and 2000, the country accepted 531,310 Vietnamese political refugees and asylum-seekers.

By the early 1980s, a secondary resettlement was underway. Vietnamese refugees were initially scattered throughout the country in wherever they could find sponsorship. The majority (27,199) settled in California, followed by 9,130 in Texas and 3,500 to 7,000 each in Pennsylvania, Florida, Washington, Illinois, New York, and Louisiana. Economic and social factors, many then moved to warmer states, such as California and Texas, with larger Vietnamese communities, better jobs, and social safety nets.

Though Vietnamese immigration has continued at a fairly steady pace since the 1980s, the pathway to immigration for Vietnamese today has shifted entirely. As opposed to the earlier history of Vietnamese migration that stemmed predominantly from refugees, an overwhelming majority of Vietnamese are now granted lawful permanent residence (LPR) on the basis of family sponsored preferences or by way of immediate relatives to U.S. citizens, at 53% and 44% respectively. This marks a complete about face, in 1982, 99% of Vietnamese that were granted LPR were refugees, while today that group is a mere 1% of the Vietnamese population.

Vietnamese Fishermen's Association Antitrust Suit
Vietnamese refugees in the Gulf Coast faced discrimination as they arrived throughout the 1970s and 1980s. White fishermen complained about unfair competition from their Vietnamese-American counterparts. "Non-Vietnamese docks refused to allow Vietnamese American boats to dock, [and] wholesalers refused to buy shrimp from Vietnamese Americans." The Ku Klux Klan attempted to intimidate Vietnamese-American shrimp fishermen, at one time having plans to burn Vietnamese shrimp boats. The Vietnamese Fishermen's Association, with the aid of the Southern Poverty Law Center, won a 1981 antitrust suit against the Klan, disbanding the "private army of white supremacists."

Community issues

Language barrier
Language was the first barrier Vietnamese refugees with limited English proficiency had to overcome. English uses tonal inflection sparingly (primarily for questions); Vietnamese, a tonal language, uses variations in tone to differentiate between meanings of a sound.  can have one of seven meanings, depending on tone: "mother", "ghost", "but", "code", "rice plant", "cheek" or "tomb". Another difference between Vietnamese and English is the former's widespread use of status-related pronouns. You is the widely used second-person singular pronoun in American English, but the Vietnamese second-person singular pronoun varies by gender ( or ), social status ( or ) and relationship (or ).

Employment
Vietnamese Americans' income and social classes are diverse. In contrast to Vietnamese refugees who settled in France or Germany, and similar to their counterparts who arrived in Canada, The Czech Republic, The United Kingdom, Poland and Australia, refugees arriving in the United States often had a lower socioeconomic standing in their home country and more difficulty integrating due to greater linguistic and cultural barriers.

Vietnamese Americans have arrived in the U.S. primarily as refugees, with little or no money. While not as academically or financially accomplished collectively as their East Asian counterparts, census data indicates that Vietnamese Americans are an upwardly-mobile group; their economic status improved substantially between 1989 and 1999.

Most first-wave Vietnamese immigrants initially worked at low-paying jobs in small services or industries. Finding work was more difficult for second-wave and subsequent immigrants, due to their limited educational background and job skills. They were employed in blue-collar jobs, such as electrical engineering and machine assembling. In San Jose, California, the economic difference can be seen in the Vietnamese-American neighborhoods of Santa Clara County. In downtown San Jose, many Vietnamese work as restaurant cooks, repairmen and movers. The Evergreen and Berryessa sections of the city are middle- to upper-middle-class neighborhoods with large Vietnamese-American populations, many of whom work in Silicon Valley's computer, networking and aerospace industries.

Many Vietnamese Americans have established businesses in Little Saigons and Chinatowns throughout North America, and have initiated the development and revitalization of older Chinatowns. Many Vietnamese Americans are small business owners. According to a 2002 Census Bureau survey of Vietnamese-owned firms, more than 50 percent of the businesses are personal services or repair and maintenance. The period from 1997 to 2002 saw substantial growth in the number of Vietnamese-owned business. Throughout the country, many Vietnamese (especially first or second-generation immigrants) have opened supermarkets, restaurants, bánh mì bakeries, beauty salons, barber shops and auto-repair businesses. Restaurants owned by Vietnamese Americans tend to serve Vietnamese cuisine, Vietnamized Chinese cuisine or both, and have popularized phở and chả giò in the U.S. In 2002 34.2 percent of Vietnamese-owned businesses were in California, followed by Texas with 16.5 percent.

Young Vietnamese Americans adults are well educated, and often provide professional services. Since older Vietnamese Americans have difficulty interacting with the non-Vietnamese professional class, many Vietnamese Americans provide specialized professional services to fellow immigrants. Of these, a small number are owned by Vietnamese Americans of Hoa ethnicity. In the Gulf Coast region (Louisiana, Texas, Mississippi and Alabama), Vietnamese Americans are involved with the fishing industry and account for 45 to 85 percent of the region's shrimp business. However, the dumping of imported shrimp from Vietnam has impacted their livelihood. Many remain employed in Silicon Valley's computer and networking industry, despite layoffs following the closure of various high-tech companies. Recent immigrants not yet proficient in English work in assembly, restaurants, shops and nail and hair salons. Eighty percent of California's nail stylists and 43 percent nationwide are Vietnamese Americans. Nail-salon work is skilled manual labor which requires limited English-speaking ability. Some Vietnamese Americans see the work as a way to accumulate wealth quickly, and many send remittances to family members in Vietnam. Vietnamese entrepreneurs in Canada and Europe have adopted the U.S. model and opened nail salons in their country of residence, where few nail salons previously existed.

Gangs and incarceration

In California, Vietnamese-Americans account for the highest percentage of inmates among Asian-Americans at 22%. In Richmond, Virginia, Vietnamese-Americans had the second-highest arrest rates, among all demographics, following African-Americans.

In 2001, Rob Krott published an article in the journal Law and Order stating that the crime rate of Vietnamese-Americans was "out of proportion to their size [of population]." Krott reported that Vietnamese gangs in Southern California are a societal problem, and that their most perpetrated crime is home invasion.

Political leanings

According to a 2008 Manhattan Institute study, Vietnamese Americans are among the most-assimilated immigrant groups in the United States. Although their rates of cultural and economic assimilation were comparable to other groups (perhaps due to language differences between English and Vietnamese), their rates of civic assimilation were the highest of the large immigrant groups. As political refugees, Vietnamese Americans viewed their stay in the United States as permanent and became involved in the political process at a higher rate than other groups. Vietnamese Americans have the highest rate of naturalization among all immigrant groups: in 2015, 86% of Vietnamese immigrants in the United States who were eligible for citizenship already became citizens.

"Socialization processes due to unique experiences during a critical imprinting experience among Vietnamese immigrants form an explanation that relies on duration of time spent in the United States. Immigrant cohorts, as instantiated in waves of immigration, are of course related to years spent in the destination country ..." However, there are "substantive within-group differences among Vietnamese Americans and that the classical linear assimilation hypothesis does not adequately explain political incorporation. Although naturalization does appear to increase steadily over time, with earlier waves more likely to have acquired citizenship, the same pattern of associations does not appear for our analysis of registration and voting. Notably, it was the third wave of Vietnamese immigrants who were most likely to cast ballots in the last presidential election".

The relationship between Vietnam and the United States has been the most important issue for most Vietnamese Americans. As refugees from a communist country, many are strongly opposed to communism. In a 2000 Orange County Register poll, 71 percent of respondents ranked fighting communism as a "top priority" or "very important". Vietnamese Americans stage protests against the Vietnamese government, its human rights policy and those whom they perceive to be sympathetic to it. In 1999, opposition to a video-store owner in Westminster, California who displayed the flag of Vietnam and a photo of Ho Chi Minh peaked when 15,000 people held a nighttime vigil in front of the store; this raised free speech issues. Although few Vietnamese Americans enrolled in the Democratic Party because it was seen as more sympathetic to communism than the Republican Party, Republican support has eroded in the second generation and among newer, poorer refugees. However, the Republican Party still has strong support; in 2007, in Orange County, Vietnamese Americans registered as Republicans outnumber registered Democrats (55 and 22 percent, respectively). According to the 2008 National Asian American Survey, 22 percent identified with the Democratic Party and 29 percent with the Republican Party. Exit polls during the 2004 presidential election indicated that 72 percent of Vietnamese American voters in eight eastern states polled voted for Republican incumbent George W. Bush, compared to the 28 percent voting for Democratic challenger John Kerry. In a poll conducted before the 2008 presidential election, two-thirds of Vietnamese Americans who had decided said that they would vote for Republican candidate John McCain. The party's vocal anti-communism is attractive to older and first-generation Vietnamese Americans who arrived during the Reagan administration. Although most Vietnamese overall are registered Republicans, most young Vietnamese lean toward the Democratic Party because some Vietnamese are members of labor unions. An Asian American Legal Defense and Education Fund (AALDEF) poll found that Vietnamese Americans aged 18–29 favored Democrat Barack Obama by 60 percentage points during the 2008 presidential election. According to a 2012 Pew Research Center survey, 47% of registered Vietnamese-American voters leaned Republican and 32% Democratic; among Vietnamese Americans overall (including non-registered voters), 36% leaned Democratic and 35% Republican.

Vietnamese Americans have exercised political power in Orange County, Silicon Valley, and other areas, and have attained public office at the local and statewide levels in California and Texas. Janet Nguyen is a member of the California State Assembly; Andrew Do is part of the five-member Orange County Board of Supervisors; Bao Nguyen was mayor of Garden Grove, California, and Vietnamese Americans have also been the mayors of Rosemead and Westminster, California. Several serve (or have served) on the city councils of Westminster, Garden Grove and San Jose, California, and Hubert Vo is a member of the Texas state legislature.

In 2008, Westminster became the first city with a majority Vietnamese-American city council. In 2004, Van Tran was elected to the California state legislature. Viet Dinh was the Assistant Attorney General of the United States from 2001 to 2003 and the chief architect of the Patriot Act. In 2006, 15 Vietnamese Americans were running for elective office in California. In August 2014, Fort Hood Col. Viet Xuan Luong became the first Vietnamese-American general in U.S. history. Four Vietnamese Americans have run for a seat in the United States House of Representatives as their party's endorsed candidate.

Some Vietnamese Americans have lobbied city and state governments to make the flag of South Vietnam (rather than the flag of Vietnam) the symbol of the Vietnamese in the United States, and objections were raised by the Vietnamese government. The California and Ohio state governments enacted laws adopting the South Vietnamese flag in August 2006. Since June 2002, 13 states, seven counties and 85 cities had adopted resolutions recognizing the South Vietnamese flag as the Vietnamese Heritage and Freedom Flag.

During the months following Hurricane Katrina, the Vietnamese-American community in New Orleans (among the first to return to the city) rallied against a landfill used to dump debris near their community. After months of legal wrangling, the landfill was closed. In 2008, Katrina activist Anh "Joseph" Cao won Louisiana's 2nd congressional district seat in the House of Representatives; Cao was the first Vietnamese American elected to Congress.

Since the onset of Hong Kong protests in June 2019, Vietnamese Americans have been the most active Asian Americans rallying in favor of the pro-democracy (pro-Labor Union) Hongkongers, organizing vocal marches in California, where their largest community exists. They clashed with pro-communist Mainland Chinese immigrants. Trúc Hồ, a famed Vietnamese American singer, wrote a song in July 2019 to praise the Hong Kong protesters. The song went viral among Vietnamese and Hong Kong citizens.

Among Asian Americans, Vietnamese Americans have been the most supportive of Donald Trump since his 2016 presidential election. According to a AAPI.org survey, 46% of Vietnamese Americans supported Trump in the 2020 presidential election, compared to 36% for Joe Biden. The reasons credited for the strong support of Trump by Vietnamese Americans is his strong stance against socialism and for capitalism and his dislike for mainland China's trade policies and alleged currency manipulation. Many pro-Trump rallies were organized by Andy Ngo to support his re-election during the 2020 campaign throughout the country. Many Vietnamese Americans gained headlines for participating in the January 6 United States Capitol attack by waving the South Vietnamese flags and marching alongside neo-Nazi and white nationalist supporters. 

Some Vietnamese Americans, especially younger ones have expressed that they feel "disappointed" about the display of the flag at the Capitol riot, mainly "to see it be associated with hate, with racism, with supremacy"; that "The ideas of authoritarianism, of overturning the people's will, are not the principles that this flag stands for", and that the incident made them "look like clowns". It was reported that due to the incident, "many younger people started questioning their elders' unyielding loyalty to and interpretation of the banner's [South Vietnam Flag] values".

Student associations

A number of colleges have a Vietnamese Student Association, and an annual conference is hosted by the Union of North American Vietnamese Student Associations for current or future members.

Culture

While adapting to a new country, Vietnamese Americans have tried to preserve their traditional culture by teaching their children the Vietnamese language, wearing Vietnamese traditional dress for special occasions and showcasing their cuisine in restaurants throughout the country. Family loyalty is the most important Vietnamese cultural characteristic, and more than two generations traditionally lived under one roof. The Vietnamese view a family as including maternal and paternal grandparents, uncles, aunts and cousins. In adapting to American culture, most Vietnamese American families have adopted the nuclear pattern while trying to maintain close ties with their extended families.

Vietnamese family culture is reflected in veneration of the dead. On the anniversary of an ancestor's death, relatives gather for a festive meal and to share stories about the person's children, works or community. In a typical Vietnamese family, parents see themselves with a vital role in their children's lives; according to a survey, 71 percent of Vietnamese-American parents said that being a good parent is one of the most important things in their lives. Generations of Vietnamese were taught to help their families without question, and many Vietnamese Americans send American goods and money and sponsor relatives' trips or immigration to the U.S. In 2013, remittances sent to Vietnam via formal channels totaled $11 billion, a tenfold increase from the late 1990s.

Falling in late January or early February,  marks the lunar new year. Although the full holiday lasts for seven days, the first three days are celebrated with visits to relatives, teachers and friends. For , the Vietnamese commemorate their ancestors with memorial feasts (including traditional foods such as square and round sticky-rice cakes:  and ) and visits to their ancestors' graves. In California, Texas and other states with substantial Vietnamese communities, Vietnamese Americans celebrate  by visiting their relatives and friends, watching community-sponsored dragon dances and visiting temples or churches.

For , food, money and clothes made of special paper are prepared to worship the wandering souls of ancestors.

Religion

Forty-three percent of Vietnamese Americans are Buddhists. Many practice Mahayana Buddhism, Taoism, Confucianism and animist practices (including ancestor veneration) influenced by Chinese folk religion. Twenty-nine to thirty percent of Vietnamese Americans are Catholic, and a smaller number are Protestant. Vietnamese are a major ethnic group notable among Asian American Catholics. Hòa Hảo and Caodaism are two of the other religions of Vietnamese Americans.

There are 150 to 165 Vietnamese Buddhist temples in the United States, with most observing a mixture of Pure Land (Tịnh Độ Tông) and Zen (Thiền) doctrines and practices. Most temples are small, consisting of a converted house with one or two resident monks or nuns. Two of the most prominent figures in Vietnamese-American Buddhism are Thich Thien-An and Thich Nhat Hanh. There are also Theravada-based Vietnamese temples like Chua Buu Mon in Port Arthur, Texas.

Ethnic subgroups
Although census data counts those who identify as ethnically Vietnamese, how Vietnamese ethnic groups view themselves may affect that reporting.

Hoa
The Hoa people are ethnic Chinese who migrated to Vietnam. In 2013, they made up 11.5 percent of the Vietnamese-American population, and in majority, identified itself as Vietnamese. Some Hoa Vietnamese Americans also speak a dialect of Yue Chinese, generally code-switching between Cantonese and Vietnamese to speak to both Hoa immigrants from Vietnam and ethnic Vietnamese. Teochew, a variety of Southern Min which had virtually no speakers in the US before the 1980s, is spoken by another group of Hoa immigrants. A small number of Vietnamese Americans may also speak Mandarin as a third (or fourth) language in business and other interaction.

Eurasians and Amerasians
Some Vietnamese Americans are Eurasians: people of European and Asian descent. They are descendants of ethnic Vietnamese and French settlers and soldiers (and sometimes Hoa) during the French colonial period (1883–1945) or the First Indochina War (1946–1954).

Amerasians are descendants of an ethnic Vietnamese (or Hoa) parent and an American parent, most commonly white or black. The first substantial generation of Amerasian Vietnamese Americans were born to American personnel, primarily military men, during the Vietnam War from 1961 to 1975. Many Amerasians were ignored by their American parent; in Vietnam, the fatherless children of foreign men were called con lai ("mixed race") or the pejorative bụi đời ("dust of life"). Since 1982, Amerasians and their families have come to the United States under the Orderly Departure Program. Many could not be reunited with their fathers, and commonly arrived with their mothers. In some cases, they were part of false families that were created to escape from Vietnam. Many of the first-generation Amerasians and their mothers experienced significant social and institutional discrimination in Vietnam, where they were denied the right to education; discrimination worsening after the 1973 American withdrawal, and by the U.S. government, which discouraged American military personnel from marrying Vietnamese nationals and frequently refused claims of U.S. citizenship that were lodged by Amerasians born in Vietnam if their mothers were not married to their American fathers.

Discrimination was even greater for children of black servicemen than for children of white fathers. Subsequent generations of Amerasians (children born in the United States) and Vietnamese-born Amerasians whose American paternity was documented by their parents' marriage or their subsequent legitimization have had an arguably more favorable outlook.

The 1988 American Homecoming Act helped over 25,000 Amerasians and their 67,000 relatives in Vietnam, to emigrate to the United States. Although they received permanent-resident status, many have been unable to obtain citizenship and express a lack of belonging or acceptance in the US because of differences in culture, language and citizenship status.

Ethnic Tai-Lao
The Thái peoples, including the Laotians, Nungs and other Tai ethnicities who migrated to the United States were majority from Northern Vietnam. The community, overall, do not develop a separate ethnic identity sentiment due to long friendly relations with the Vietnamese rulers, thus the community don't regard itself Thai Americans or Laotian Americans, and see itself part of Vietnamese American diaspora.

Cham
Cham are an ethnic minority of Vietnam, and a small number of them came to the United States as refugees. Today, the Chams are polarized between, though few embraced Vietnamese identity but rather still feel loyal to the fallen Champa, while still working with most Vietnamese American groups.

See also

 List of Vietnamese Americans
 List of Vietnamese American groups
 List of U.S. cities with large Vietnamese-American populations
 Vietnamese language in the United States

References

Further reading
 Chan, Sucheng, ed. (2006). The Vietnamese American 1.5 Generation: Stories of War, Revolution, Flight, and New Beginnings 323pp
 Tran, Tuyen Ngoc. Behind the Smoke and Mirrors: The Vietnamese in California, 1975–1994 (PhD dissertation, University of California, Berkeley, 2007).
Min Zhou and Carl L. Bankston (1998). Growing Up American: How Vietnamese Children Adapt to Life in the United States. New York: Russell Sage Foundation

External links

 Vietnamese American Heritage Project, Vietnam Center & Sam Johnson Vietnam Archive, Texas Tech University.
 Viet Stories: Vietnamese American Oral History Project at University of California, Irvine.
 Other oral history projects about Vietnamese Americans.
 Vietnamese in the Diaspora Digital Archive.
 US–Vietnam Research Center at University of Oregon.

 

USA
Asian-American society
Southeast Asian American
Political refugees in the United States